Alcher of Clairvaux was a twelfth-century Cistercian monk of Clairvaux Abbey. He was once thought to be the author of two works, now attributed by many scholars to an anonymous pseudo-Augustine of the same period. 

Thomas Aquinas made the traditional attribution of the De spiritu et anima to Alcher. It is now reckoned to be a compilation of c. 1170, taken from Alcuin, Anselm, Bernard of Clairvaux, Augustine of Hippo, Cassiodorus, Hugh of St Victor, Isaac of Stella, and Isidore of Seville; also Boethius. It is a source for medieval views on self-control, and the doctrine that the soul rules the body.

De diligendo Deo is a devotional work, also traditionally attributed to Alcher.

At one point in the Summa Theologica, Aquinas writes about De Spiritu et Anima, "that book is not of great authority."

References
 J. M. Canivez: Alcher, in: Dictionnaire de Spiritualité v. 1 (1937), 294f
 Leo Norpoth, Der Pseudo-Augustinische Traktat: De spiritu et anima (Dissertation, Munich, 1924; Cologne, 1971)
 G. Raciti, L'autore del De spiritu et anima, Rivista di filosofia neoscolastica 53 (1961) 385-401

Notes

External links
Jacques Maritain Center page

12th-century French people
French Cistercians
French Christian monks
Year of birth unknown

Year of death unknown